The montane tiny greenbul (Phyllastrephus albigula) is a species of songbird in the bulbul family, Pycnonotidae.
It is endemic to the Usambara and Nguru Mountains in Tanzania. Its natural habitats are subtropical or tropical moist montane forests and subtropical or tropical moist shrubland.

Taxonomy and systematics
The lowland tiny greenbul was originally described in the genus Macrosphenus. Until 2009, the montane tiny greenbul was considered as conspecific with the lowland tiny greenbul as the tiny bulbul. Some authorities continue to consider the two species as conspecific. Alternate names for the montane tiny greenbul include the green-crowned greenbul, Usambara bulbul and Usambara greenbul.

References

Phyllastrephus
Greenbuls
Endemic birds of Tanzania
Birds described in 1919
Taxa named by Hermann Grote